Jeevan Mukt (translation: Freedom in Life) is a 1977 Bollywood film directed by Sudhendu Roy. This family drama stars Girish Karnad and Laxmi in the lead support from Parikshit Sahani, Vidya Sinha, Suresh Oberoi, Meena Roy, Sidhir and Mala Jaggi.

The story is about Anita's quest for love, her tribulations in this process and her ultimate realisation of freedom in life (aka Jeevan Mukt).

Cast
Parikshat Sahni as Satish Sharma
Girish Karnad as Amarjeet
Laxmi
Vidya Sinha
Suresh Oberoi

Crew
Direction – Sudhendu Roy
Production – Sudhendu Roy
Edition – Subhash Sehgal
Production company – S.R. Productions
Music composition – Rahul Dev Burman
Lyrics – Yogesh
Playback – Asha Bhosle

Soundtrack

References

External links
 

1977 films
1970s Hindi-language films
Films scored by R. D. Burman
Films directed by Sudhendu Roy